New Road may refer to:

 New Road, Bangkok, the former name of Charoen Krung Road
 New Road (London), England, now part of the London Inner Ring Road
 New Road, Oxford, England, location of Oxford Castle
 New Road, Worcester, England, home ground of Worcestershire County Cricket Club
 New Road of Kathmandu, a high street and financial hub of Kathmandu, Nepal
 The New Road, a Scottish novel by Neil Munro, adapted as a BBC TV serial
 New Road: New Directions In Art & Writing (1943-6), a series of anthologies published by Wrey Gardiner